The University of Wisconsin–Platteville Baraboo Sauk County is a two-year institution of the University of Wisconsin System and a branch campus of the University of Wisconsin–Platteville.  It was formerly known as University of Wisconsin–Baraboo/Sauk County and was a part of the University of Wisconsin Colleges.  UW–Platteville Baraboo Sauk County is located in Baraboo, Wisconsin, United States.

Prior to July 1, 2018, UW–Baraboo/Sauk County was one of 13 freshman-sophomore liberal arts transfer campuses of the UW Colleges, and offers a general education associate degree. After beginning their studies at UW–Platteville Baraboo Sauk County, students transfer to other UW System institutions as well as to colleges and universities throughout the country to complete their bachelor's degrees. In 2013, the college had an average class size of 22.5 students. The   campus overlooks the Baraboo bluffs.

On July 1, 2018, the campus formally merged with UW–Platteville, a four-year comprehensive university that is part of the University of Wisconsin System. At that time it received its current name.

History
The university opened in 1968.

Circa the mid-to-late 20th century West Baraboo did not financially contribute to UW–Baraboo.

Campus
The university is adjacent to Baraboo High School, Jack Young Middle School, and Gordon K. Willson Elementary School. The only passage between the City of Baraboo and UW–Platteville Baraboo Sauk County is through West Baraboo.

In 2017 the six tennis courts of Baraboo High were in disrepair because of soil conditions, with two of the courts severely damaged. At that time the district was discussing with UW–Baraboo the possibility of having new tennis courts built on the college property with the district sharing the courts; the college would have eight courts, with the district building four of them.

The campus is also home to the 18 hole Baraboo Lions Disc Golf Course, which was built in 1996.

References

External links
UW–Baraboo/Sauk County official website

University of Wisconsin-Platteville Baraboo Sauk County
Education in Sauk County, Wisconsin
Buildings and structures in Sauk County, Wisconsin
Baraboo, Wisconsin
Two-year colleges in the United States
Baraboo Sauk County
Baraboo Sauk County